Sar-e Pol or Sari Pul is the capital city of the province of Sar-e Pol Province in northern Afghanistan. It is in Sari Pul District. Sar-e Pol elevation is 2,155 ft (657 m).

History
In 2015, it had an official population of 51,075. in 2018 the population was 164,600. There were 5,675 total number of dwellings in a total land area of 2,990 hectares. The city's distance from  Kabul is 349 km. Its population is mostly Tajiks and Uzbeks.

The Taliban overran and captured the city on the 8th August 2021 as part of their 2021 offensive.

External links

References

Populated places in Sar-e Pol Province
Cities in Afghanistan
Provincial capitals in Afghanistan
Populated places with period of establishment missing